The Kent Senior Cup is an English football knock-out competition played between senior clubs in the county of Kent. It is administered by the Kent County Football Association (KCFA).

History

Now known as the Kent Senior Cup it was originally named, until the 1897–98 season, as the Kent Cup with the first competition played during the 1888–89 season. The cup itself, engraved as the "Kent County Football Association Challenge Cup", cost £33 and is made of 62 ounces of silver and surmounted by the rampant horse of Kent. (2018 Photograph). The Kent Cup competition was preceded as the KCFA’s County knock-out tournament by the Kent County Badge: this was first competed for in 1886 and won for each of its three seasons by Chatham – who were also the first winners of the Kent Cup. 

Following the founding of the Kent League in 1894 for the three seasons from 1894–95 until 1896–97 the Kent Cup was awarded to the champions of the League. The knock-out competition for the cup resumed from the 1897–98 season when it was renamed the Kent Senior Cup, with Gravesend United the winners. For the 1919–1920 season only a trophy presented as a gift to the KCFA named as the Victory Cup replaced the Kent Senior Cup trophy. The competition was suspended for four seasons between 1914 and 1918 owing to the World War I and there have been two other seasons in which the Kent Senior Cup has not been competed for: in 1940–1941 owing to World War II; and 2020–2121 owing to the COVID-19 pandemic.

Initially the final of the competition was played at a venue pre-selected by the KCFA: for the first six seasons this was at Chatham, then after taking place at New Brompton, Ashford, Tunbridge Wells and returning to Chatham for one season the final was held at Faversham for the next six years. For a long spell between 1908 until 1950 the venue for the final was the Athletic Ground, Maidstone (except 1942 at Belvedere). Thereafter the final was held mostly at the Priestfield Stadium, Gillingham until 1965 after which for the next eight seasons it was contested (as it had been in the 1961–62 season) over two legs held at each of the finalists ground with the aggregate score determining the winner. The venue for the final then reverted to Maidstone then to Gillingham for fourteen seasons. Then following playing the final at Sittingbourne and for the first time outside Kent at Millwall, since 1998 (with several exceptions) the winner of a coin toss between the final protagonists decided which would have the choice to host the final match. The semi–finals were played on neutral grounds until the mid 1950s.

From 1902 until 1961 the final took place on Easter Monday and into the 1950s would attract in excess of ten thousand spectators – 13,119 were at the 1951–1952 final between Kent League club Dover and Southern League club Dartford. Between 1983 until 2002 the final was held on the early May bank holiday however since then the final has struggled for a set date owing to end of season promotion and relegation play-off matches and in the 2007–2008 season was even deferred until the 2008–2009 pre–season.

For five seasons from 1980–1981 until 1985–1986 the Kent Senior Cup competition was sponsored by the Chatham Reliance Building Society. The Swedish office business machine company Facit was then the sponsor for the next eleven seasons until 1996–1997. Bose were the sponsor in the early 2000s after which between 2003–04 and 2006–07 the cup was sponsored and named after Kent football patron John Ullmann. Between 2010–11 and 2013–14 portablefoodlights.com sponsored the cup, then for the 2014–15 season Kent Reliance Building society revived their sponsorship from thirty years previously and this continued through to the 2017–18 season. In 2022 the KCFA announced that all Kent County Cups, including the Senior Cup, would be sponsored by the ferry operator DFDS.

The 2013–14 Kent Senior Cup competition marked the 125th anniversary since its inception in the 1888–89 season; to celebrate the landmark the final took place at Priestfield Stadium, home of Gillingham FC. The match was won by Ebbsfleet United who beat Dover Athletic 4–0 – the winning club being a descendant of Northfleet United who in the 1920s achieved an enduring record of five consecutive season Kent Senior Cup wins.

Past winners of the Kent Senior Cup include Royal Arsenal (now Arsenal) in 1889–90, and Gillingham in 1945–46 and 1947–48; the two sides went on to become members of the Premier League and Football League respectively. Both Charlton Athletic and Maidstone United won the cup whilst members of the Football league and Gillingham have continued to compete. The Football League clubs field a development team rather than their full league side in the competition.

Cup Final Matches

Record by Club
There have been 32 clubs (including follow-on clubs) who have won the Kent Senior Cup; a further 7 clubs have competed in the final without winning; and an additional 14 clubs reached the semi-final stage but didn’t progress to the final match.

Winning / Losing Sequences
Consecutive Final wins: 
5: Northfleet United 1924 to 1928. 
3: Dartford, 1931 to 1933; Royal Artillery Depot (Woolwich) 1943 to 1945; Gravesend & Northfleet 2000 to 2002; Margate 2003 to 2005.

Consecutive Final losses: 
2: Nine clubs have lost two finals consecutively on 16 occasions: Dartford (5, including losing in two separate 5 season periods two consecutive finals twice); Ashford United / Ashford Town (2); Maidstone United (2); Sittingbourne (2, both in a 5 season period);  Folkestone Invicta (1); Gillingham (1); Margate (1); Shorts Sports (1); Tunbridge Wells Rngrs (1).

Run of winning the Final match (not consecutive):
7: Northfleet United between 1921 and 1938; Dover between 1952 and 1972.
5: Maidstone United between 1901 and 1914. 

Run of losing the Final match (not consecutive):
8: Sittingbourne between 1904 and 1928.
6:  Folkestone Invicta between 1999 and 2022 (current run).
5: Gillingham between 1949 and 2015 (current run); Margate between 1960 and 1970; Dover Athletic between 1994 and 2014.

Run of winning a Semi-final match (not consecutive):
11: Northfleet United between 1909 and 1928.
7: Maidstone United between 1914 and 1966.
6: Dartford between 1931 and 1947; Maidstone United between 1974 and 1980.

Run of losing a Semi-final match (not consecutive):
9: Sheppey United between 1893 and 1924.
7: Fisher Athletic / Fisher between 1985 and 2002 (current run).
6: Folkestone / Folkestone Town between 1937 and 1953.

External links
 Kent FA, >Kent Senior Cup portal
  Official 2022–2023 results web page
Official 2021–2022 results web page
 Official 2019–2020 results web page
 Official 2018–2019 results web page
 Kent Football League Archive: Kent Senior Cup History
 Kent Online: Kent Senior Cup (search)
 Kentish Football: Kent Senior Cup (search)

References

Cup
County Cup competitions
Recurring sporting events established in 1889